Catimbaua  is a genus of shrubs in the family Linderniaceae. It contains a single species, Catimbaua pendula. It has pendant branches, greyish leaves and red flowers. The species occurs on steep cliffs in the Catimbau National Park in Pernambuco, north-eastern Brazil.

References

Linderniaceae
Monotypic Lamiales genera